= Sandra Brand =

Holocaust writer (1910–2005)

- Born: 1910
- Died: 2005 (aged 94–95)
- Occupations: Writer; lecturer
- Writing career
- Subject: Holocaust

Sandra Brand was a writer, born in 1910, who survived the Holocaust and wrote several books and gave lectures on the subject. She died in 2005 at the age of 95.

The Simon Wiesenthal Center awards both the Bruno Brand Tolerance Prize and the Sandra Brand Memorial Book Award to non-fiction works on the subject of tolerance thanks to endowments from her.

During the war, she pretended to be Cecilya Szarek (as described in her book I Dared to Live), and was helped by a German officer.

== List of works ==
- I Dared to Live (ISBN 1887563504) (1978)
- Between Two Worlds (ISBN 0884002047) (1982)
- Roma (ISBN 0738854859) (1992)
- Glimpses of West Africa (ISBN 0738854875) (1999)
- Good People, Bad People (ISBN 1887563857) (2004)
