= I Dared to Live =

1978 book by Sandra Brand

- Author: Sandra Brand
- Language: English
- Subject: Holocaust
- Genre: Autobiography
- Publisher: Schreiber
- Publication date: 1978
- Publication place: United States
- ISBN: 1-887-56350-4

I Dared to Live is a book about the Holocaust written by Sandra Brand. It tells her story, under the name Roma Brand. Roma obtains fake papers in order to pretend to be a Christian woman called Cecylia Szarek. Although she loses her husband and only child, Bruno, she does survive the war and moves to the United States.
